Abbie Hogg (born 22 August 2002) is a Scottish cricketer. In August 2019, she was named in the Scotland Women's Twenty20 International (WT20I) squad for the 2019 Netherlands Women's Quadrangular Series. She made her WT20I debut for Scotland, against Ireland, on 14 August 2019.

References

External links
 

2002 births
Living people
Scottish women cricketers
Scotland women Twenty20 International cricketers
Place of birth missing (living people)